is a Japanese action-adventure game developed by Lancarse for the Nintendo DS, and published by Taito in 2008. Taito's parent company, Square Enix, published a North American localization of the game later that year. The Legend of Kage 2 is the sequel to The Legend of Kage (1985), an arcade game developed and distributed by Taito.

Plot
The player takes control of: either Kage, the ninja from the first game, (armed with a katana and shuriken); or Chihoiro, a kunoichi from Iga raised by Hanzo Hattori, (armed with a kusarigama). Both are loyal to the shogun Ieyasu Tokugawa. Their mission is to rescue Tokugawa's daughter, Princess Kirihime; she has been kidnapped by the demonic warlord Yoshiro Kuyigusa and his aide-de-camp, the rogue samurai Yukinosuke Riko, in an attempt to overthrow the Tokugawa shogunate.

Gameplay
Kage and Chihoiro each have a personal story and 17 different ninjutsu techniques to master. They have skills such as abilities to climb vertical cliffs, hanging from ceilings, and blocking enemy attacks with the sword (which could also be done in the original game). The game introduces ninpo skills such as Bunshin no Jutsu, a technique that creates deadly duplicates of the player. Mastering ninjutsu enables players to launch powerful elemental attacks and summon monsters.

Reception

The game received "average" reviews according to the review aggregation website Metacritic. In Japan, Famitsu gave it a score of two sevens, one eight, and one seven for a total of 29 out of 40.

It was noted for its difficulty, which was reported to rise considerably after the first level. The game was also praised for the well-designed boss fights, and crisp, vivid art, but was also criticized for the lack of detail in the environments. The controls were reported to have minor problems such as being unable to jump immediately after an attack. The story was also criticized for straying from the original source material, as well as its lack of voiceovers and repetitive level layouts.

References

External links
 

2008 video games
Video games about ninja
Nintendo DS games
Nintendo DS-only games
Square Enix games
Taito games
Ubisoft games
Video game sequels
Video games about samurai
Video games featuring female protagonists
Video games set in feudal Japan
Video games developed in Japan

ja:影之伝説